Hight is a surname. Notable people with the surname include:

 Ahmo Hight (born 1973), American fitness model, swimsuit model and actress
 Elena Hight (born 1989), American snowboarder
 James Hight (1870–1958), New Zealand university professor, educational administrator and historian
 Michael Hight (born 1961), New Zealand artist